Oliver Maass is a German television series.

See also
List of German television series

External links
 

1985 German television series debuts
1985 German television series endings
German children's television series
ZDF original programming
German-language television shows